Ogi Ogas is an American writer who received doctoral training as a computational neuroscientist. As of May 2016, he is a visiting scholar at the Harvard Graduate School of Education, where he serves as Project Head for the Individual Mastery Project. Ogas is also known for his participation in game shows, especially Grand Slam (2007) and Who Wants to Be a Millionaire (2006).

Early life and education
Ogi Ogas was born and grew up in Annapolis, Maryland. He attended Severna Park High School, where he was a member of the school's It's Academic team.  Ogas was awarded a Ph.D. in computational neuroscience by Boston University in 2009. He was a United States Department of Homeland Security Fellow during his graduate studies.

Career
Ogas is a visiting scholar at the Harvard University School of Education.

Ogas is the Project Head for the Individual Mastery Project in the Harvard Graduate School of Education, which The Washington Post has described as "aimed at understanding the development of individual excellence."

Written works

A Billion Wicked Thoughts
Ogas's nonfiction book A Billion Wicked Thoughts (2011, with Sai Gaddam) analyzed the sexual terms used in web searches by approximately 100 million internet users. Some critics praised the book for its accessibility and entertainment value. Others noted that because the collected web searches were anonymous, the authors were limited in the conclusions they could draw from their analyses.

This is What It Sounds Like 
In 2022, W. W. Norton published This is What It Sounds Like: What the Music You Love Says About You, by Ogas and Susan Rogers.

Other contributions

Shrinks: The Untold Story of Psychiatry
Ogas is listed as a contributor to Jeffrey Lieberman's Shrinks. As advertising prose from the Hatchett Books Group describes it, the book:

Shrinks received a starred review in Kirkus, was a New York Times Book Review Editors' Choice, and was longlisted for the PEN/E.O.Wilson Literary Science Writing Award.

Game show appearances
{| cellpadding="5" cellspacing="2" width="350" style="float:right; background:#FFFFFF"
|- style=text-align:center; bgcolor="CFB53B"
| colspan=2| <span style="color:white;">'$1 Million (15 of 15) - No Time Limit</span>
|- style=text-align:center; bgcolor="00008B"
| colspan=2| Which of these ships was not one of the three taken over by colonists during the Boston Tea Party?
|- style=text-align:left; bgcolor="00008B"
|width="50%"|• A:  Eleanor
|style=text-align:left; bgcolor="00008B"|• B: Dartmouth
|- style=text-align:left; bgcolor="00008B"
|• C: Beaver
|style=text-align:left; bgcolor="green"|• D:  William
|- style=text-align:center
| colspan=2| Ogas's $1,000,000 question
|}
Ogas won $500,000 on an episode of Who Wants to Be a Millionaire that aired on November 8, 2006, using his cognitive science research to guide his game strategy. Ogas has intimated in interviews that he had a strong hunch about his final question (about the Boston Tea Party, shown), after tentatively eliminating three of the choices; he ultimately decided to walk away because of the large amount of money at risk ($475,000 of his $500,000). His hunch was correct. Since playing, he has appeared 22 times as the syndicated show's "Ask The Expert" Lifeline.

Ogas was also a contestant on Grand Slam, which aired in August and September 2007. He said that after feeling the intense emotional pressure on Millionaire, he developed a new suite of cognitive techniques for Grand Slam, including calming techniques as well as mathematical, verbal, and mnemonic heuristics derived from his brain research. He defeated former Millionaire contestant Nancy Christy in his first-round game and all-time game show winnings record holder and Jeopardy! champion Brad Rutter in the second round. Ogas then defeated former Twenty-One champion David Legler in the semifinals before losing to Ken Jennings in the final. More recently, he appeared on ABC's game show 500 Questions'' as one of the challengers.

References

External links
 

1970s births
Living people
Boston University alumni
Computational neuroscience
Contestants on American game shows
Loyola University Maryland alumni
Place of birth missing (living people)
Writers from Annapolis, Maryland
Writers from Boston